Wholly Smoke is a 1938 Warner Bros. Looney Tunes cartoon directed by Frank Tashlin. The short was released on August 27, 1938, and stars Porky Pig. This episode teaches about the dangers of smoking.

Plot
The short starts with a man at church ringing the bell to signal the beginning of the service. The scene shifts to the house of Porky Pig whose mother is calling to him to come downstairs. A younger Porky comes flying down the handrail of the stairs just stopping before crashing into a vase. His mother proceeds to give him a nickel for the collection plate at church, including a disclaimer about not spending the money on candy. Porky reassures his mother and leaves. Along the way he runs into a bully standing alongside a wooden fence. The bully is practicing smoking tricks with a cigar when Porky arrives and chides him for smoking while underage. The bully then gets in Porky's face, sarcastically accusing him of being a tough guy. After a few moments of arguing Porky offers a bet to prove he is not a wimp, the deal being the cigar for the nickel. Enticed by the proposition, the bully quickly gives up his cigar. Porky in turn tries to repeat the same set of tricks — with disastrous results.

Porky soon goes into a haze and stumbles into a smoke shop. An anthropomorphic cloud shrinks Porky in size and then introduces himself as someone all smokers were well acquainted with, "Nick O'Teen". Nick then offers Porky all the smoking he can handle, and suddenly, a wide variety of tobacco products and smoking devices come to life to force feed Porky everything from chewing tobacco to cigarettes, all set to the song "Little Boys Shouldn't Smoke" (which is a parody of the then-famous "Mysterious Mose" song). At the culmination of the nightmare Porky awakens and rushes to church. As he is sitting reading his hymnal the collection plate starts coming towards him when he starts to panic. He races out of the church and grabs the nickel from the bully. He thrusts the cigar into the bully's mouth as it promptly explodes. He hurries back to church just in time to give his offering and the cartoon ends with himself promising to never smoke again, for the rest of his life.

Reception
Animation historian David Gerstein writes that Wholly Smoke represents "Warner Bros.' most successful effort to capture what it's like to be a child. Wholly Smoke isn't just a morality tale or just another wacky Warner flight into dreamland. It's also the surprisingly real story of a little boy—our Porky—and his struggle with a larger world."

Edited versions
The version of this cartoon that aired on Nickelodeon, the syndicated Merrie Melodies Show, and Cartoon Network was a colorized (redrawn on Cartoon Network; computer-colorized on Nickelodeon and the syndicated Merrie Melodies Show) version that had the following edits from the original black-and-white version (though an uncut version of the redrawn version is said to exist):
The beginning of the "Little Boys Shouldn't Smoke" song where four matchsticks strike themselves and burn out to form blackface (while singing in the style of The Mills Brothers) was cut on Nickelodeon and The Merrie Melodies Show. On Cartoon Network, the scene was left intact, but the blackface was changed to red during the colorization process.
The part where a pipe cleaner sticks his head in a dirty pipe and comes out looking and singing like Cab Calloway was cut on The Merrie Melodies Show and Cartoon Network. It was left uncut in the early 1990s on Nickelodeon, but by the mid-to-late 1990s, the scene was edited out, though in the flashback after the "NO SMOKING" cigarette march, one can see the part that was cut on Nickelodeon (the newer, redrawn version on Cartoon Network replaces the Cab Calloway part during the montage with the Indian cigars scene that was cut when Cartoon Network aired the redrawn version of this cartoon).
The short shot of Porky tied to a post while a tribe of Indian pipes dance around him was cut on Cartoon Network (but left in on The Merrie Melodies Show and Nickelodeon).

Home media
Wholly Smoke is available uncut and digitally remastered on the Looney Tunes Golden Collection: Volume 5 DVD set, and the Looney Tunes Platinum Collection: Volume 3 DVD and Blu-ray set.

References

External links
 

1938 films
Looney Tunes shorts
1938 animated films
Short films directed by Frank Tashlin
American black-and-white films
American social guidance and drug education films
Tobacco control
1930s American animated films
Porky Pig films
Films scored by Carl Stalling